Stephen Pambiin Jalulah is a Ghanaian politician and member of parliament for the Pru West constituency in the Bono East region of Ghana. Currently, he is the Deputy Minister for Roads and Highways after he was sworn in by Nana Akufo-Addo.

Early life and education 
He was born on 22 October 1974 and hails from Saboba in the Northern region of Ghana. He had his GCE Ordinary Level in General Science in 1992 and had his GCE Ordinary Level in Business in 1994. He also had his GCE Advance Level in Business in 1996. He further had his Degree in Finance and Banking in 2003 and also had his bachelor's degree in law in 2014. He also had his master's degree in marketing with E-Commerce in 2011.

Career 
He was the District Chief Executive at the Ministry of Local Government for the Pru West district and also the Pru District. He was also the District Manager for the National Health Insurance Authority.

Political career 
Stephen is a member of NPP and currently the MP for Pru West Constituency. He won the parliamentary seat with 16,606 votes making 56.7% of the total votes whilst the incumbent Masawud Mohammed had 12,671 votes making 43.3% of the total votes. Currently, he is the Deputy Minister for Roads and Highways.

Committees 
Stephen is a member of the Members Holding Offices of Profit Committee and also a member of the Works and Housing Committee.

Personal life 
Stephen is a Christian.

References 

Living people
1974 births
New Patriotic Party politicians
Ghanaian MPs 2021–2025